Francisco López de Osornio (c. 1645 – c. 1700) was a Spanish landowner and military man, who had an active work in the beginnings of the cattle ranch of the Province of Buenos Aires. He was the founder of the López de Osornio family in Argentina, and the maternal ancestor of Juan Manuel de Rosas.

He was born in Andalucia, Spain, the son of Francisco de Osornio and Catalina López Moreno. He carried out his elementary studies possibly in Madrid, and arrived at the Río de la Plata from Spain in the year 1674. He married July 21, 1679 in Buenos Aires to Tomasa Merlo de la Mota, daughter of Alejandro de Merlo and Teresa de la Mota, belonging to distinguished Creole families of Córdoba.

References 

1640s births
1700s deaths
People from Buenos Aires
Spanish colonial governors and administrators
Spanish military personnel